Adrianna Sułek (pronounced ;born 3 April 1999) is a Polish athlete competing in the combined events. She won the silver medal in the pentathlon at the 2022 World Indoor Championships. Sułek placed fourth in the heptathlon at the 2022 World Championships, and took silvers at the 2022 European Championships and 2023 European Indoor Championships.

She was the heptathlon 2018 World Under-20 Championships bronze medallist, and 2021 European U23 champion. Sułek is the Polish record holder for both the heptathlon and pentathlon. She won seven individual national titles.

Career

After two medals in age-group championships, Adrianna Sułek had a breakthrough 2022 season. At the World Indoor Championships in Belgrade in March, the 22-year-old won the silver medal in pentathlon, breaking by 43 points Urszula Włodarczyk's 24-year-old Polish national record with her score of 4851 points. In July, she finished fourth in the heptathlon at the World Championships held in Eugene, Oregon, totalling 6672 points and beating by 56 pts Małgorzata Nowak's Polish record dating back to 1985. She wrapped up her long season the following month by taking silver at the European Championships Munich 2022, where she lost injured (biceps femoris problems) only to two-time Olympic champion Nafissatou Thiam. Sułek set in this competition personal bests in three disciplines. She achieved altogether four heptathlons over 6400 points that year to secure her first overall World Combined Events Tour victory, becoming only the second Polish athlete after Włodarczyk in 1998 to do so.

2023–present
In March 2023, Sułek broke for the first time the pentathlon 5000-point barrier to set her second Polish record that year in the event. She established personal bests in four events and scored 5014 pts at the European Indoor Championships held in Istanbul, Turkey, beating the world record set in 2012 in the same Ataköy Arena by Ukraine’s Nataliya Dobrynska (5013 pts). Finishing first the 800 m run, the final of the five events in pentathlon, Sułek held the new world record for about six seconds only and had to settle for silver, however, as Thiam set even better mark of 5055 pts.

Achievements

International competitions

Personal bests

National titles
 Polish Athletics Championships
 Heptathlon: 2019, 2021, 2022
 4 × 100 m relay: 2019
 Polish Indoor Athletics Championships
 Pentathlon: 2018, 2019, 2022, 2023

References

External links

 

1999 births
Living people
Polish heptathletes
Athletes (track and field) at the 2020 Summer Olympics
Olympic athletes of Poland
World Athletics Indoor Championships medalists
20th-century Polish women
21st-century Polish women
European Athletics Championships medalists